Serres is a city in Greece, seat of the Serres regional unit.

Serres may also refer to:

Places
In Germany:
 Serres, Germany, a part of Wiernsheim in Baden-Württemberg

In Greece:
 Serres, a city in Central Macedonia
 Serres Province
 Serres Prefecture
 Serres (regional unit)
 Serres railway station
 Principality of Serres, a principality existing from 1355 until 1371 with the capital being Serres

In France:

 Serres, Aude in the Aude département
 Serres, Hautes-Alpes in the Hautes-Alpes département
 Serres, Meurthe-et-Moselle in the Meurthe-et-Moselle département
Serres-Castet, in the Pyrénées-Atlantiques département 
Serres-Morlaàs
Serres-Sainte-Marie
Serres-et-Montguyard
Serres-Gaston

People

Dominic Serres (1710–1793), born French, marine painter in England 
John Thomas Serres (1759–1825), marine painter and son of the above
Étienne Renaud Augustin Serres (1786–1868), a French embryologist
Günther Serres (1910–1981), a German politician
Michel Serres (1930–2019), a French philosopher
Olivia Serres (1772-1834), English painter, writer, and impostor who claimed the title Princess Olive of Cumberland.
Olivier de Serres (1539–1619), a French agricultural writer

See also

Serre (disambiguation)

ru:Серре